PDCP College Basaitha Benipatti , also known as PDCP College, is a public college located in Basaitha, Benipatti, Madhubani, Bihar, India. It was established in 1988.

References

Universities and colleges in Bihar
Madhubani district
Educational institutions established in 1988
1988 establishments in Bihar